Villemoisson-sur-Orge (literally Villemoisson on Orge) is a commune in the Essonne department in Île-de-France in northern France.

Population
Inhabitants of Villemoisson-sur-Orge are known as Villemoissonnais in French.

See also
Communes of the Essonne department

References

External links

Official website 

Mayors of Essonne Association 

Communes of Essonne